Introducing Kenny Burrell is the debut album by American jazz guitarist Kenny Burrell, recorded in 1956 and released by Blue Note Records. In 2000, the album was released on the 2 CD-set Introducing Kenny Burrell: The First Blue Note Sessions with Kenny Burrell Volume 2, plus bonus tracks.

Reception
The Allmusic review by Scott Yanow awarded the album four stars, stating: "Burrell displays what was already an immediately recognizable tone. At 24, Burrell had quickly emerged to become one of the top bop guitarists of the era, and he is in particularly excellent form... Enjoyable music".

Track listing

Personnel
 Kenny Burrell – guitar (except on #6)
 Tommy Flanagan – piano (except on #6)
 Paul Chambers – double bass (except on #6)
 Kenny Clarke – drums
 Candido Camero – conga (except on #2 & 4)

References

Blue Note Records albums
Kenny Burrell albums
1956 debut albums
Albums recorded at Van Gelder Studio